The Pethiyagoda's crestless lizard (Calotes pethiyagodai) is an agamid lizard endemic to Sri Lanka. Locally known as පෙතියාගොඩගේ නොසිලු කටුස්සා (Pethiyagodage nosilu katussa).

Description
Researchers named the species "Pethiyagoda's crestless lizard" to honor Rohan Pethiyagoda for his contributions to the biodiversity of Sri Lanka. This species has earlier been misidentified as Calotes liocephalus but researchers found that the males of C. pethiyagodai lack a gular pouch unlike the males of C. liocephalus; scalation is also different.

Distribution
The lizard is restricted to the Knuckles Mountain Range, at elevations of  asl. It inhabits forest edges and is found in trees and shrubs.

Diet
Diet consists of insects like dragonflies and moths.

References

pethiyagodai
Reptiles of Sri Lanka
Endemic fauna of Sri Lanka
Reptiles described in 2014
Taxa named by Jakob Hallermann